Ulanov, feminine form Ulanova is a Russian surname.

Notable people
Notable people with this surname include:
 Alexei Ulanov, Russian figure skater
 Ann Belford Ulanov, American professor of psychiatry and religion 
 Barry Ulanov, American writer
 Denis Ulanov, Kazakhstani weightlifter 
 Galina Ulanova, Russian ballerina
 Igor Ulanov, hockey player
 Vladimir Ulanov, writer
 Vladimir Ulanov, sportsman

Places 
  (or Ulanov) - a village in the Ukraine, located in the Khmilnyk Raion of Vinnytsia Oblast

See also 
 Ulanow (disambiguation)